The Western Tasmanian Football Association was an Australian Rules Football competition based on the West Coast of Tasmania, Australia.
The competition was made up of mostly miners living and working on the State's West Coast.

Of all the clubs that participated in the competition, only Queenstown Football Club (now nicknamed the Crows) and Rosebery-Toorak Football Club remain in existence, participating in competitions on the North West Coast.

History
There was an earlier named entity proposed in the 1890s.
 The League began in 1924 as the Queenstown Football Association.
 The League underwent a name change to the Western Tasmanian Football Association in 1963.
In 1976, the WTFA absorbed the surviving clubs from the Murchison Football Association.
The Lyell Football Club and the Gormanston Football Club merged in 1976 and formed Lyell-Gormanston Football Club.
 In 1977, the Smelters Football Club and the City Football Club Merged and formed the Queenstown Football Club.
Rosebery Football Club and Toorak Football Club merged in 1987 forming the Rosebery-Toorak Football Club.
 Rosebery-Toorak Football Club leave the WTFA and join the NWFA to start in 1990.
 In 1991, the Strahan Football Club re-formed and entered the WTFA, they last played in the Murchison FA in 1958.
 The WTFA closed down at the end of 1993. The Queenstown Crows were formed in 1994 and are still playing in the Darwin Assoc

Premierships

Queenstown FA premiership winners: 1924-1963

 1924 ― Smelters
 1925 ― Railway
 1926 ― City
 1927 ― Smelters
 1928 ― Smelters
 1929 ― Smelters
 1930 ― Smelters
 1931 ― Smelters
 1932 ― Mines United
 1933 ― Mines United
 1934 ― City
 1935 ― Mines United
 1936 ― Gormanston
 1937 ― City
 1938 ― Smelters
 1939 ― City
 1940 ― City
 1941 ― City
 1942 ― Lyell
 1943 ― Lyell

 1944 ― Lyell
 1945 ― Lyell
 1946 ― Lyell
 1947 ― City
 1948 ― City
 1949 ― Gormanston
 1950 ― Gormanston
 1951 ― Lyell
 1952 ― City
 1953 ― City
 1954 ― Smelters
 1955 ― Smelters
 1956 ― Smelters
 1957 ― City
 1958 ― Lyell
 1959 ― Smelters
 1960 ― City
 1961 ― Lyell
 1962 ― Lyell
 1963 ― City
WTFA Premiership winners: 1964-1993

 1964 ― Lyell 15.17 (107) v Gormanston 9.5 (59)
 1965 ― Gormanston 9.10 (64) v Lyell 4.14 (38)
 1966 ― Gormanston 16.11 (107) v Lyell 13.9 (87)
 1967 ― Toorak 8.9 (57) v Rosebery 6.17 (53)
 1968 ― Gormanston 10.16 (76) v Toorak 8.12 (60)
 1969 ― Gormanston 12.14 (86) v Rosebery 8.5 (53)
 1970 ― Gormanston 19.11 (125) v Toorak 16.13 (109)
 1971 ― Rosebery 20.18 (138) v Toorak 19.12 (126)
 1972 ― Rosebery 11.12 (78) v Toorak 10.10 (70)
 1973 ― Smelters 15.13 (103) v Toorak 12.14 (86)
 1974 ― Rosebery 16.17 (113) v Smelters 7.12 (54)
 1975 ― Rosebery 15.17 (107) v Toorak 15.13 (103)
 1976 ― Lyell-Gormanston 26.25 (181) v City 8.12 (60)
 1977 ― Toorak 15.21 (111) v Lyell-Gormanston 12.18 (90)
 1978 ― Queenstown 16.26 (122) v Toorak 14.15 (99)
 1979 ― Rosebery 15.12 (102) v Toorak 13.12 (90)
 1980 ― Rosebery 12.17 (89) v Toorak 10.12 (72)
 1981 ― Lyell-Gormanston 20.18 (138) v Rosebery 13.13 (91)
 1982 ― Lyell-Gormanston 14.14 (98) v Toorak 9.17 (71)
 1983 ― Queenstown 7.13 (55) v Lyell-Gormanston 4.4 (28)
 1984 ― Queenstown 15.19 (109) v Lyell-Gormanston 7.21 (63)
 1985 ― Zeehan 22.10 (142) v Lyell-Gormanston 14.14 (98)
 1986 ― Lyell-Gormanston 12.15 (87) v Queenstown 12.14 (86)
 1987 ― Lyell-Gormanston 9.16 (70) v Tullah-Savage River 7.14 (56)
 1988 ― Lyell-Gormanston 11.18 (84) v Zeehan 7.9 (51)
 1989 ― Lyell-Gormanston 14.22 (106) v Queenstown 16.8 (104)
 1990 ― Lyell-Gormanston 22.21 (153) v Queenstown 16.8 (104)
 1991 ― Lyell-Gormanston 18.18 (126) v Strahan 14.7 (91)
 1992 ― Lyell-Gormanston 20.19 (139) v Zeehan 13.12 (90)
 1993 ― Lyell-Gormanston 17.19 (121) v Queenstown 12.12 (84)

Individual awards
The senior B&F was the Bartram Medal.
The reserves B&F was the ALB. Broadby Trophy.
Seniors and reserves both had leading goalkicker awards.

1987 Ladder

FINALS

Notes

See also
Australian rules football in Tasmania
Leven Football Association
Darwin Football Association
North Western Football Association

Defunct Australian rules football competitions in Tasmania
Western Tasmania